The Bollywood Boyz are a Canadian professional wrestling tag team composed of brothers Gurvinder "Gurv" Sihra (born November 13, 1984) and Harvinder "Harv" Sihra (born November 2, 1987). They are best known for their time in WWE, where Gurvinder and Harvinder performed under the ring names Sunil Singh and Samir Singh, respectively.

They made their main roster debut on SmackDown in April 2017, repackaged as The Singh Brothers and the managers of Jinder Mahal. They managed Mahal to his reign as WWE Champion and continued to accompany him until 2019, when the duo began wrestling on 205 Live. In October 2020, they returned to using The Bollywood Boyz team name and gimmick.

Professional wrestling career

Early career (2005–2015)
Gurv began training in 2004 with Rip Rogers at Ohio Valley Wrestling, Harley Race, and in the Hart Dungeon. Gurv debuted in Ohio Valley Wrestling in October 2005, and Harv followed suit. The brothers wrestled for a short time as singles wrestlers: Harv as "Bollywood Don" and Gurv as "Golden Lion". As a tag team, The Bollywood Boyz (originally The Bollywood Lions) won the ECCW Tag Team Championship five times between 2011 and 2015. Early in their careers, the brothers also wrestled on Tony Condello's "Death Tour" of Manitoba, a tour known for its rough conditions.

In 2011, The Bollywood Boyz wrestled in India as part of the TNA-sponsored Ring Ka King promotion. On December 19, 2011, they took part of a tournament to crown the inaugural RKK Tag Team Champions defeating The Mumbai Cats (Leopard and Puma) in the quarterfinals. The following night they were eliminated from the tournament by RDX (Sir Brutus Magnus and Sonjay Dutt) in the semifinals. On January 22, 2012, The Bollywood Boyz defeated RDX (Abyss and Scott Steiner) to become the RKK Tag Team Champions. On April 23, 2012, they vacated the championships after the promotion closed.

On July 24, 2015, The Bollywood Boyz made their debut for Jeff Jarrett's promotion Global Force Wrestling (GFW), where they participated in a tournament to crown the inaugural GFW Tag Team Champions. They defeated The Akbars in the quarterfinals of the tournament. On October 23, 2015, at Global Force Wrestling's TV tapings, The Bollywood Boyz defeated Reno Scum to become the first ever GFW Tag Team Champions.

WWE

NXT and 205 Live (2016–2017)
On June 13, 2016, Gurv and Harv were announced as participants in WWE's Cruiserweight Classic tournament. On June 23, both Sihras were eliminated from the tournament in their first round matches, with Gurv losing to Noam Dar and Harv losing to Drew Gulak. The Bollywood Boyz debuted in the WWE developmental territory NXT at the September 15 tapings. They also took part in the second annual Dusty Rhodes Tag Team Classic; however, they were eliminated by The Authors of Pain in the first round. On the premiere episode of 205 Live in November 2016, The Bollywood Boyz defeated Tony Nese and Drew Gulak in their debut tag team match.

Managing Jinder Mahal (2017–2019)

On the April 18, 2017 episode of SmackDown Live, they made their main roster debut as The Singh Brothers; Gurv was renamed Sunil Singh, while Harv was renamed Samir Singh. They interfered in a six-pack challenge match to determine the number one contender for Randy Orton's WWE Championship at Backlash, helping Jinder Mahal win the match, turning heel in the process. They also interfered in Orton's House of Horrors match against Bray Wyatt at Payback, distracting Orton long enough for Mahal to attack him with the stolen WWE Championship, allowing Wyatt to take advantage and defeat Orton with a Sister Abigail. At Backlash, the Singh Brothers were at ringside for Mahal, ultimately helping him defeat Randy Orton and capturing his first WWE Championship. At Money in the Bank, the two interfered in Mahal's WWE Championship rematch against Orton, ultimately helping him retain the title. At Battleground, they interfered in Mahal's Punjabi Prison match against Orton for the WWE Championship, being fought off by Orton. However, The Great Khali interfered, allowing Mahal to retain the title. After being injured, the brothers wore a neck brace and a cast, respectively. They soon recovered and continued to distract Mahal's foes in matches, including helping Mahal defeat Shinsuke Nakamura at SummerSlam and Hell in a Cell to retain the title. On the November 7 episode of SmackDown Live, after Mahal lost the title to AJ Styles, they were attacked by Mahal for being unsuccessful in helping him retain the WWE Championship. On the December 12 episode of SmackDown Live, The Singh Brothers showed signs of a face turn after hugging Styles and insulting Mahal, but remained heel after being attacked by Styles. On the January 16, 2018 episode of SmackDown Live, Samir suffered a torn ACL during a ringside brawl with Bobby Roode. On April 8, Sunil made his WrestleMania debut at WrestleMania 34, accompanying Mahal in a fatal four-way match against Bobby Roode, Randy Orton and Rusev for the United States Championship, which Mahal won after Sunil distracted Rusev.

On April 16, The Singh Brothers moved to Raw brand as part of the Superstar Shake-up alongside Jinder Mahal. On the October 15 episode of Raw, Samir returned after his injury to unite with his brother and Mahal. Sunil and Samir wrestled their first match on the January 1, 2019 episode of Raw when they teamed up with Mahal to defeat Heath Slater and Rhyno, in a 2-on-3 handicap match.

Return to 205 Live and 24/7 Champions (2019–2021)
During the 2019 WWE Superstar Shake-up, the Singh Brothers and Jinder Mahal were drafted back to SmackDown. The following week, the Singhs were drafted over to 205 Live, separating them from Mahal. Since then, they have changed their gimmicks, very similar to their previous gimmick of The Bollywood Boyz and have been competing in tag team matches regularly. On October 21, 2019, Sunil - after a distraction from Samir - pinned R-Truth backstage during Raw to win the WWE 24/7 Championship, marking the first title for either of the Singhs in WWE.  10 days later at Crown Jewel, Sunil lost the title to R-Truth after they both were eliminated from a battle royal, but later in the evening Samir pinned Truth backstage to win the title for the first time in his own right. 18 days later, Samir lost the title backstage on an episode of Raw to R-Truth, who was disguised as a doctor. Since then, both brothers have regained and lost the championship at various house shows. On the October 9, 2020 edition of 205 Live, it was announced that The Singh Brothers would return to the brand, going back to The Bollywood Boyz gimmick. On June 25, 2021, they were released from their WWE contracts.

All Elite Wrestling
On the October 17, 2022 episode of AEW Dark: Elevation, The Bollywood Boyz made their debut in a losing effort against the Gunn Club.

Other media
Gurv and Harv, as The Singh Brothers, appear in WWE 2K19 and WWE 2K20 as non-playable managers for Jinder Mahal.

Personal lives
The brothers are originally from Burnaby, British Columbia, Canada. They both graduated from Moscrop Secondary School. Gurv graduated from Douglas College in British Columbia, where he studied criminology. He has also worked in loss prevention and has a third degree black belt in Taekwondo. He and his wife have one son, named Gurveer, who was born on December 13, 2019. Harv also attended Douglas College, studying history. He has also worked as a model and actor. Harv appeared in the 2015 movie Brothers. Both brothers appeared in the movie Russell Madness, which also starred fellow professional wrestler John Morrison. Gurv and Harv are both Sikhs.

Championships and accomplishments
All-Star Wrestling (British Columbia)
King of the Island Tournament (2009) - Gurv
CanAm Wrestling
CanAm Tag Team Championship (1 time)
Defy Wrestling
Defy Tag Team Championship (1 time)
Elite Canadian Championship Wrestling
ECCW Tag Team Championship (5 times)
NWA Pacific Northwest Junior Heavyweight Championship (2 times) - Gurv (1), Harv (1)
NWA Canadian Junior Heavyweight Championship (1 time) - Gurv
 Global Force Wrestling
 GFW Tag Team Championship (1 time)
 GFW Tag Team Championship Tournament (2015)
 Pro Wrestling Illustrated
 Gurv/Sunil ranked No. 240 of the top 500 singles wrestlers in the PWI 500 in 2017 and 2019
 Harv/Samir ranked No. 236 of the top 500 singles wrestlers in the PWI 500 in 2017 and 2019
Real Canadian Wrestling
RCW Tag Team Championship (1 time)
 Ring Ka King
RKK Tag Team Championship (1 time)
Thrash Wrestling
Thrash Tag Team Championship (1 time)
 WWE
 WWE 24/7 Championship (9 times) - Sunil (4), Samir (5)

References

Further reading

External links
ECCW profile
Global Force Wrestling profile

All Elite Wrestling teams and stables
Global Force Wrestling teams and stables
Independent promotions teams and stables
WWE teams and stables
Sibling duos
Canadian male professional wrestlers
Sportspeople from Burnaby
WWE NXT teams and stables
Canadian people of Indian descent
Canadian Sikhs
WWE 24/7 Champions